The Larabanga Mystic Stone is located on the outskirts of Larabanga in the West Gonja District of the Savannah region in Ghana.

History 
Larabanga is a community known to be a site of myths and mystical happenings. The stone is known to return to its original place of rest after several attempts of moving it to a different location. In the 1950s, some British road constructors were compelled to redirect a major road after 3 attempts to remove the stone. Since all efforts proved futile in moving it from its original location, the legendary rock was left at its place of rest and it is now conserved as a tourist site by the natives to spread its history and also to generate revenue to the community.

See also 

Larabanga

References 

Tourism in Ghana